Vagnhärads SK was a Swedish football club, located in Vagnhärad, in Trosa Municipality, Södermanland County.

Background
Vagnhärads Sportklubb was a sports club which was formed in 1921.  Over the years the other sports have been dropped and the club now concentrates on football.

Since their foundation Vagnhärads SK has participated mainly in the middle and lower divisions of the Swedish football league system.  The club currently plays in Division 3 Östra Svealand which is the fifth tier of Swedish football. They play their home matches at the Häradsvallen in Vagnhärad. In October 2007 the club hosted the Brazil national team in connection with an international against Ghana at the Råsunda Stadium.

Vagnhärads SK are affiliated to the Södermanlands Fotbollförbund. The club dissolved on 8 March 2013 and merged with Trosa IF, to the new club Trosa-Vagnhärad SK.

Recent history
In recent seasons Vagnhärads SK have competed in the following divisions:

2012	Division III, Östra Svealand
2011	Division III, Östra Svealand
2010	Division III, Östra Svealand
2009	Division IV, Södermanland
2008	Division III, Södra Svealand
2007	Division III, Östra Svealand
2006	Division III, Östra Svealand
2005	Division IV, Södermanland
2004	Division IV, Södermanland
2003	Division IV, Södermanland
2002	Division IV, Södermanland
2001	Division V, Södermanland
2000	Division VI, Södermanland Södra
1999	Division V, Södermanland Södra
1998	Division IV, Södermanland
1997	Division III, Östra Svealand
1996	Division III, Östra Svealand
1995	Division III, Östra Svealand
1994	Division III, Östra Svealand
1993	Division III, Östra Svealand

Women Football
The first team of the women football section, played until his disbanding in the Damer Division 5 A.

Footnotes

External links
 Vagnhärads SK – Official Website

Sport in Södermanland County
Football clubs in Södermanland County
Association football clubs established in 1921
1921 establishments in Sweden
Association football clubs disestablished in 2013